 

The Short Chassis Volante (also known as the Short Wheel Base (SWB) Volante) was the first Aston Martin to be called an Aston Martin Volante, 'Volante' meaning 'Flying' in Italian. As it was the first Aston Martin to be called a 'Volante' any 'drop-head' version of the DB4 and DB5 series should therefore be called a 'Convertible' and not a 'Volante', 

The car is a cross between the DB5 (same chassis) and DB6 (bumpers, rear church/TR4 lights, oil cooler, leather stitching), but is closer to being a DB5. Only 37 cars were ever built, being constructed on the last DB5 chassis, between the dates of October 1965 and October 1966. Calling it a "Short Chassis" is a bit of a misnomer; it is a unique Aston model. The "short" comes from comparing it to the subsequent DB6, which has a longer chassis. When compared to the DB5, it is not "short" but rather the same size.

External links 
netcarshow.com – Images of a Short Chassis Volante

Short Chassis Volante

Cars introduced in 1965
Cars discontinued in 1966